The Tunis-Goulette-Marsa or TGM is a   (standard gauge) commuter rail line in Tunisia. It links the capital city, Tunis, with the town of La Marsa via La Goulette.

Overview
The TGM was the first railway in Tunisia. It was inaugurated in 1872, and has been known as the TGM since 1905.

Stations 
 Tunis Marine
 Le Bac
 La Goulette
 La Goulette Neuve
 La Goulette Casino
 Khereddine
 L'Aéroport
 Le Kram
 Carthage Salammbô
 Carthage Byrsa
 Carthage Dermech
 Carthage Hannibal
 Carthage Présidence
 Carthage Amilcar
 Sidi Bou Saïd
 Sidi Dhrif
 La Corniche
 Marsa Plage

See also
 SNCFT
 Société des transports de Tunis

External links

 Tunisia360 TGM-thread

Tunis TGM
Tunis